William Thorne Buckland (1819 – 17 January 1876) was a 19th-century Member of Parliament in New Zealand.

Buckland was born in 1819 or 1820. His mother was Elizabeth (née Mortimore) and his father was the broker John Buckland; they were from Devon, England. The auctioneer Alfred Buckland was a younger brother.

Buckland arrived in New Zealand in 1841 from South Australia, and was a butcher in Auckland, then a farmer in the Waikato. He married Susan Channing on 13 April 1843 at St Paul's Church in Auckland.

Buckland was appointed to the Auckland Executive Council of the Auckland Province in November 1856 (the source does not state and end date), and was again appointed from February to July 1857. He was elected to the Auckland Provincial Council for the Raglan electorate in November 1861 and served until 1869. From 1869 to 1873, he represented the Franklin electorate. He had no intention of standing for the Provincial Council again but happened to ride past the nomination meeting in Newmarket for the Eden electorate. There was only one nomination thus far for the two available positions, and Buckland was talked into being nominated. As the number of nominations matched the number of available positions, he was declared elected unopposed, and served until his death.

He then represented the Franklin electorate from 1871 to 1875. He was nominated for the 1876 election and gave a speech at the nomination meeting on 10 January 1876, but withdrew his nomination before the end of the proceedings. The Auckland Star suggested that the sole purpose of his nomination was that he could make a speech in opposition to Sir George Grey. Buckland left for the Waikato immediately afterwards to support Alfred Cox in his candidacy in the  electorate. However, he became ill with symptoms of heat stroke and returned to his home in Remuera.

He died at his home in Remuera, Auckland aged 56 years after that brief illness. He was buried at St Stephen's Cemetery in Parnell. His wife had died in September 1871; she had committed suicide after having become depressed. Jessie Buckland was his son John's daughter.

Notes

References

1819 births
1876 deaths
Members of the Auckland Provincial Council
New Zealand MPs for North Island electorates
Members of the New Zealand House of Representatives
Members of Auckland provincial executive councils
New Zealand farmers
Burials at St Stephen's Cemetery, Parnell
19th-century New Zealand politicians
William